The Miss California competition selects the representative for the state of California in the Miss America competition.

The pageant began in Santa Cruz in 1924 and was held there in 1925. During the years 1926 through 1946 in years when the Miss California pageant was held, the competition was primarily in San Francisco and Venice, California. In 1947, it returned to Santa Cruz and was held there annually until 1985, after which it moved to San Diego in response to years of protests and a "Myth California" counter pageant organized by local feminist activists led by Ann Simonton and Nikki Craft. It has been held in Fresno, California since 1994.

Catherine Liang of San Francisco was crowned Miss California on June 25, 2022 at the Paul Shaghoian Memorial Concert Hall Fresno, California. She competed for the title of Miss America 2023 at the Mohegan Sun in Uncasville, Connecticut where she was a Women in Business Finalist and Non-finalist Talent Winner.

Gallery of past titleholders

Results summary 
The following is a visual summary of the past results of Miss California titleholders at the national Miss America pageants/competitions. The year in parentheses indicates the year of the national competition during which a placement and/or award was garnered, not the year attached to the contestant's state title.

Placements 
 Miss Americas: Fay Lanphier (1925), Rosemary LaPlanche (1941), Jean Bartel (1943), Marilyn Buferd (1946), Lee Meriwether (1955), Debra Maffett (1983)
 1st runners-up: Adrienne Dore (1925), Phyllis Dobson (1936), Claire James (1938), Rosemary LaPlanche (1940), Phyllis Mathis (1945), Suzanne Reamo (1961), Charlene Dallas (1967), Lucianne Buchanan (1975), Kristy Cavinder (2010), Crystal Lee (2014)
 2nd runners-up: Fay Lanphier (1924), Blanche MacDonald (1933), Jeanne Shores (1953), Susan Anton (1970), Janet Carr (1976), Rita Ng (2001)
 3rd runners-up: Lillian Knight (1924), Phyllis Randall (1937) (tie), Marguerite Skliris (1939), Lorna Anderson (1958), Sandra Jennings (1959), Susan Bronson (1960), Linda Mouron (1977), Marlise Ricardos (1989), Tiffany Stoker (1996)
 4th runners-up: Lucille Lambert (1942), Laura Emery (1947), Jone Pedersen (1949), Rebekah Ann Keller (1998), Nicole Lamarche (2004), Veena Goel (2005), Noelle Freeman (2012)
 Top 7: Jackie Geist (2009)
 Top 8: Melissa Chaty (2008)
 Top 10: Patricia Johns (1954), Joan Beckett (1957), Susan Henryson (1962), Wendy Douglas (1964), Susan Shipley (1974), Connie Lee Haugen (1978), Jacquelynne Fontaine (2007), Arianna Afsar (2011), Jessa Carmack (2017)
 Top 12: Virginia Donham (1935), Shirley Ballard (1944)
 Top 13: Polly Ellis (1945)
 Top 15: Ruby Smith (1927), Bertha Weizel (1927), Eileen Kim (2020)
 Top 16: Joanne Durant (1951)
 Top 20: Stephanie Baldwin (2002)

Awards

Preliminary awards
 Preliminary Lifestyle and Fitness: Rosemary LaPlanche (1940 and 1941), Jean Bartel (1943), Marilyn Buferd (1946), Jone Pedersen (1950), Joanne Durant (1951), Jeanne Shores (1953), Patricia Johns (1954), Lee Meriwether (1955), Joan Beckett (1957), Sandra Jennings (1959), Sherri Raap (1965), Charlene Dallas (1967), Carolyn Stoner (1972), Lucianne Buchanan (1975), Janet Carr (1976), Debra Maffett (1983), Lisa Michelle Duncan (1994), Tiffany Stoker (1996), Rebekah Ann Keller (1998), Nicole Lamarche (2004)
 Preliminary Talent: Phyllis Dobson (1936), Phyllis Randall (1937), Marguerite Skliris (1939), Jean Bartel (1943), Polly Ellis (1945), Susan Henryson (1962), Charlene Dallas (1967), Debra Maffett (1983), Rita Ng (2001), Veena Goel (2005), Dustin-Leigh Konzelman (2006), Jacquelynne Fontaine (2007), Kristy Cavinder (2010)

Non-finalist awards
 Non-finalist talent: Sandra Lynne Becker (1966), Sharon Terrill (1969), Karin Kascher (1971), Christine Acton (1979), Lisa Kahre (1987), Maria Ostapiej (1991), Jennifer Hanson (1995), Danielle Coney (1999), MaryAnne Sapio (2000), Dustin-Leigh Konzelman (2006), Catherine Liang (2023)

Other awards
 Miss Congeniality: Susan Henryson (1962)
 Final Night Swimsuit: Nicole Lamarche (2004)
 Miss America Scholar: Rita Ng (2001)
 STEM Scholarship Award Winners: Crystal Lee (2014)
 Waterford Business Scholarship: Danielle Coney (1999)
 Women in Business Finalists: Catherine Liang (2023)

Winners

References

External links
 

California
California culture
Women in California
Recurring events established in 1924
1924 establishments in California
Annual events in California